Mykolaiv is a city and municipality in southern Ukraine, and the administrative center of Mykolaiv Oblast. The city of Mykolaiv, which provides Ukraine with access to the Black Sea, is the location of the most downriver bridge crossing of the Southern Bug river. This city is one of the main shipbuilding centers of the Black Sea. Aside from three shipyards within the city, there are a number of research centers specializing in shipbuilding such as the State Research and Design Shipbuilding Center, Zoria-Mashproekt and others. As of 2022, the city has a population of  Mykolaiv holds the honorary title Hero City of Ukraine.

The city serves as a transportation hub for Ukraine, containing a sea port, commercial port, river port, highway, railway junction, and airport.

Much of Mykolaiv's land area consists of parks. Park Peremohy (Victory) is a large park on the peninsula just north of the city center of Mykolaiv, on the north side of the Inhul river.

Name 
The city is known under two names, which differ in Ukrainian and Russian; there are several transliterations of each name. The Ukrainian name of the city is Микола́їв, transliterated as Mykolaiv or (officially) Mykolayiv. The Russian name, Никола́ев, transliterates as Nikolaev or as Nikolayev.
The city's founding was made by the Russian conquests during the Second Russo-Turkish War of 1787–1792. Founded by Prince Grigory Potemkin as Nikolaev, it was the last of the many cities he established. On 27 August 1789, Potemkin ordered its naming near the wharf at the mouth of the Ingul river, on a high, cool and breezy spot where the Ingul river meets the Southern Bug river. To build the city he brought in peasants, soldiers, and Turkish prisoners; 2,500 were working there during 1789. The shipyards were built first (1788).

Potemkin named the city after Saint Nicholas, the patron of seafarers, on whose day (6 December) he had obtained victory at the siege of Ochakov in 1788. The name Nikolaev is known from the legal order (writ) Number 1065 by Prince Potemkin to  dated 27 August 1789.

In 1920, after the establishment of Soviet power, the Odesa provincial council (of laborers and peasants' deputies) petitioned the Soviet Ukrainian government—the All-Ukrainian Central Executive Committee (VUTSIK)—to rename the city of Mykolaiv to Vernoleninsk ("Faithful to Lenin"). As the city of Mykolaiv was a district center of the Odesan province, presumably, the petition would have been initiated by the Odesa city council, but documentary evidence of this so far has not been identified. On 15 April 1924 the Plenum of the Central Administrative-Territorial Commission of the VUTSIK considered and rejected the petition of the Odesan executive committee. Perhaps the members of the Soviet-Ukraine government thought that the name sounded too obsequious.

Information regarding the alleged renaming of Mykolaiv was disseminated by German maps of the 1920s and 1930s, as well as in German encyclopedic publications in 1927 and 1932, which show Vernoleninsk on the USSR part of the European maps. The city was designated as Mykolaiv in publications of the same map in other languages.

To distinguish Mykolaiv from the much smaller west Ukraine city of Mykolaiv in Lviv Oblast, the latter is sometimes called "Mykolaiv on the Dniester" after the major river that it is situated on, while the former is located on the Southern Bug, another major river, and may also be called "Mykolaiv on the Bug".

History 

Archaeologists have found proof of ancient settlements on the territory of Mykolaiv. In 2018, archaeologists discovered a sunken Ancient Greek ship near the Mykolaiv region, dating from the fifth century BC, the period of Greek colonization of the Northern Black Sea. Researchers stated: "This Ancient Greek ship is one of the oldest known in the Northern Black Sea."

The city has long had close associations with shipbuilding.

The area was populated throughout time by Scythians, ancient Greeks, Slavic tribes, hordes of nomads and free Zaporozhian Cossacks. However, the intensive settlement of the Mykolaiv peninsula started in the last quarter of the 18th century already after the liberation of the northern Black Sea coast region from the Ottoman Empire.

The Russian Empire's Black Sea Navy Headquarters was in Mykolaiv for more than 100 years until the Imperial Russian Navy moved it to Sevastopol, near the southern tip of the Crimean Peninsula. During the Crimean War (1853-1856), Mykolaiv became the main rear base to support Russia's efforts in the war. Most businesses that were created in the city belonged to the military-industrial complex, and, consequently, Mykolaiv was closed to foreigners for many decades.

By the late 19th century, Mykolaiv's port ranked third in the Russian Empire (after Saint Petersburg and Odesa) in trade with foreign countries. Grain-export suppliers of the steppe region (of Ukraine and Southern Russia) were the greatest in the Russian Empire. Mykolaiv had become a great industrial center in the Southern Ukraine.

Jews started to settle in Nikolayev in the late 18th century. By being in the area west of the Dnieper which was where Jews were legally allowed to reside (the Pale of Settlement), Mykolaiv became a major Jewish centre of the Russian Empire in the 19th century. During the course of the 19th century, the Czarist governments largely banned Jews from living east of the Dnieper River. In 1866 restrictions were lifted and the Jewish community of Mykolaiv developed rapidly but years later Jews suffered in the pogroms of May 1881 and April 1899. The Lubavitcher Rebbe, Menachem Mendel Schneerson (the seventh leader in the Chabad-Lubavitch dynasty) was born in Mykolaiv on 18 April 1902. In 1920, Soviet power was established. In 1926 there were 21,786 Jews (about 20.8% of the total population) in Mykolaiv.

In the course of Operation Barbarossa Mykolaiv was occupied on 16 August 1941 by German invaders. In September, German forces massacred over 35,000 non-combatants, many of them Jews, in the city and its region. During the occupation, an underground partisan sabotage group, the Mykolaiv Center, conducted guerilla activities. On 28 March 1944 the city was liberated, in part because of Soviet Senior Lieutenant Konstantin F. Olshansky's paratroopers and their daring raid during which the majority of his troops were killed.

In the post-war period Mykolaiv became one of the shipbuilding centers of the USSR, with three shipyards: Black Sea, 61 Kommunara, and Okean.

The asteroid 8141 Nikolaev (1982 SO4) was discovered in 1982 by Nikolai Chernykh at the Crimean Astrophysical Observatory and was named in honor of the city.

In March 2012, Mykolaiv gained international notoriety for lawlessness and police corruption following the rape and murder of Oksana Makar. Her three attackers were apprehended, but two were released because of family connections to local government officials. After a media outcry and public protests, all three attackers were charged with her murder.

During the Euromaidan protests of 2013–2014, Mykolayiv was the scene of anti-Yanukovich protests. After the victory of Euromaidan, the situation calmed down somewhat until 7 April 2014, when some pro-Russians tried to take over the local administration building. Pro-Ukrainians stopped them from taking over the administration building and destroyed the pro-Russian camp not far from it, after which the situation in the city became calm.

Until 18 July 2020, Mykolaiv was incorporated as a city of oblast significance. It also served as the administrative center of Mykolaiv and Vitovka Raions even though it did not belong to any of these raions. In July 2020, as part of the administrative reform of Ukraine, which reduced the number of raions of Mykolaiv Oblast to four, the city of Mykolaiv was merged into Mykolaiv Raion.

In February and March 2022, during the 2022 Russian invasion of Ukraine, Russian military forces attacked Mykolaiv and placed it under siege. Ukrainian forces barred Russian forces from the city, though Russian artillery continued to shell it.

Administrative status 

Mykolaiv is the administrative center of Mykolaiv Oblast (region), as well as that of Mykolaiv Raion. It hosts the administration of Mykolaiv urban hromada, one of the hromadas of Ukraine.

Geographic characteristics 

Mykolaiv is located in a primarily flat terrain area, the fertile, grain-producing steppe region of southern Ukraine. The lack of any mountain barriers north of Mykolaiv means that cold Arctic winds can blow south, unimpeded by any terrain elevation, to Mykolaiv in winter.

Mykolaiv is on a peninsula along the estuary of the Southern Bug river where it meets the Inhul River,  from the Black Sea. Both the Inhul River and the Southern Bug River follow very winding courses just before they join at the northeast corner of Mykolaiv. This has created several long and narrow peninsulas just north of Mykolaiv, and the main part of Mykolaiv is itself on a peninsula at a 180-degree bend in the Southern Bug River.

Mykolaiv is in the second time zone (Eastern European Time).

Ecology 

Mykolaiv has environmental issues common in many cities in Ukraine, such as pollution of water, the air, and groundwater; drinking water quality, noise, waste management, and conservation of biological diversity in the city. One of Mykolaiv's most urgent problems is the disposal of solid household waste.

The city has 18 preserved sites, totaling about :
The Mykolaiv Zoo 
The monuments of landscape art: Park Peremohy, Park People's Garden, 68 Paratroopers Park, Square, The Sivašskij, The Boulevard Bunker, Linea (Line) Park, Young Heroes Park; Youth Park in the Ingul district
The Botanical Natural Monument Memory Square
The Dubki Reserved Nature boundary
The Balabanovka Forest Reserve
The Reservoir Hydrological Reserve
The Turkish Fountain Hydrological Natural Monument
The Dubka (oak) 4 Botanical Nature Monument

Climate 

The city's climate is moderately continental- cold semi arid steppe climate with cold winters and warm to hot summers. The lowest average temperature is in January , the highest in July .

Mykolaiv has snow cover every year, but its height is low.

Average relative humidity is 73% for the year; the lowest humidity is in August (60%); the highest in December (86%). The lowest cloud are seen in August; the highest are in December.

The prevailing winds come from the North; the least frequent source of wind is the Southeast. The maximum wind speed is in February, the lowest is from July through September. In January, the average wind speed is 4.1 m/s (meters per second); in July, the average is 3.1 m/s.

Demographics 

As of 2017, 63% of the population spoke Russian at home, 7% Ukrainian, and 28% spoke both Ukrainian and Russian equally.

Awards 
The Soviet Government awarded Mykolaiv the Order of the Red Banner of Labour on 31 December 1970, for successfully fulfilling its assignments for the development of industrial production, in the USSR's five-year economic plan.

On 25 March 2022 Ukrainian President Volodymyr Zelenskyy awarded Mykolaiv the title of Hero City of Ukraine due to the Battle of Mykolaiv.

Administrative districts 
Mykolaiv is divided into four districts:

Tsentralnyi District is located in the northwest of the city. It includes the historic center of Mykolaiv, Rocket tract, Temvod, Salt, Northern, Ternovka (in Ternovca also acts village council), Matveevka, Varvarovka.
Zavodskyi District is located in the west of the city. In this area, many industrial enterprises are concentrated. It also includes neighborhoods Lescaut and Alluviation, as well as towns of Velyka Koreniha and Mala Koreniha.
Inhulskyi District (former Leninskyi District) is located in the east of Mykolaiv. Among other things, it includes the new Horticulture, YUTZ, New Watering, Old Watering. The district has a zoo, bus and railway stations.
Korabelnyi District is located in the south of the city. It includes a broad beam, Bogoyavlenske (former Zhovtneve), Balabanovka, Kulbakino.

Official symbols 
Mykolaiv adopted its current coat of arms on 26 September 1997. Its design came from the one adopted in 1883, by removing the symbol of Kherson province to which Mykolaiv didn't belong anymore.
Mykolaiv adopted its current flag on 2 July 1999 and its anthem on 11 September 2004.

Economy 

Mykolaiv is a major shipbuilding center of Ukraine since the time of both the Russian Empire (1721–1917) and the now defunct Soviet Union (1922–1991) and an important river port. The city has three major shipyards one of which is capable of building large navy ships. Other important industries are mechanical engineering, power engineering, metallurgy and food industry.

Mykolaiv was closed to foreign visitors until the late 1980s due to the large number of secret Soviet Navy projects that took place in the city (as well as due to its military air base, turbine factory and military port). The majority of the Soviet Navy's surface ships, including its only aircraft carrier, the aircraft carrier Kuznetsov, were built in Mykolaiv.

In May 2011, Ukrainian President Viktor Yanukovych visited Mykolaiv and said that Ukraine was serious about reviving and further developing its shipbuilding industry in the Mykolaiv region.

One of the largest industrial businesses in the city is the Mykolaiv Aluminia Factory (formerly part of Rusal and currently owned by Glencore), which produces aluminium oxide (alumina), raw material for the production of aluminum.

In addition to heavy industry, the city has a developed food processing industry, including a juice maker, Sandora (part of PepsiCo), a dairy products maker, Laktalis-Mykolaiv, and a brewery, Yantar. Nibulon (Ukrainian: Нібулон), one of Ukraine's biggest agriculture companies specialized in the production and exportation of grain such as wheat, barley and corn is headquartered in Mykolaiv. The company has its own maritime fleet and shipyard, the Nibulon Shipyard, and also developed its own river fleet to transport grain to export terminals.

In January 2017, the Mykolaiv Development Agency released a promo video of the city's investment potential.

The Mykolaiv Armored Factory (owned by Ukroboronprom) has been a large repair facility for Ukraine's military since the beginning of the Russo-Ukrainian War. Engineers at the plant designed an armored ambulance based on the BTR-70 to be used by the Ukrainian Armed Forces.

Ukrainian military presence 

Mykolaiv, being an important strategic city in southern Ukraine has a significant Ukrainian military presence, including the shipyards that build Ukraine's surface navy ships, the Mykolaiv Ukrainian Navy base, the "MARP" aircraft repair factory (Mykolaiv), and the Kulbakino army base (in the Mykolaiv Oblast, outside of the city of Mykolaiv).

Previously for many years after World War II the city had been home to the 92nd Guards Motor Rifle Division, the former 92nd Guards Rifle Division. The 79th Airmobile Brigade is based in the city.

Transportation 

Mykolaiv is one of Ukraine's most important transportation junctions. It is a major commercial river and sea port, and a major highway and rail junction. Mykolaiv also has a dual-function passenger and freight airport, but passenger service at the airport is not significant, compared to Ukraine's major airports. In addition to the airport and sea and river port, Mykolaiv has two train stations, and an intercity bus station.

Air 
Mykolaiv Airport (IATA code NLV), one of the largest and most technically well equipped airports in the South of Ukraine, serves the city. The airport, located northwest of Mykolaiv, is mainly used for air freight and only has limited passenger service. Russian airline UTAir Aviation offers flights from Mykolaiv to Moscow (Vnukovo – VKO airport). In addition, there are one-hour passenger flights from Odesa (the nearest major airport) to Mykolaiv. Almost all airline passenger service in the South West of Ukraine (where Mykolaiv is located) is through Odesa International Airport: to reach Mykolaiv by airplane, tourists generally reach Odesa by plane, and then take a bus, taxi or train, for approximately 2 hours, to Mykolaiv.

Kulbakyno airport, also known as Nikolaev, is a Class I military air base located just to the southeast of the city center, in Kulbakyno. It primarily supports wings of Sukhoi Su-24, Sukhoi Su-25, Sukhoi Su-27, and Mikoyan MiG-29.

Bus travel long distance 
Mykolaiv is an 8.5-hour bus ride from Kyiv's main bus station. Ukrainian private national bus companies Gyunsel and Avtoluks operate overnight buses from Kyiv to Mykolaiv seven nights per week. The bus station in Mykolaiv is located at Prospekt (Avenue) Bohoyavlenskyi 21.

Roads 

The main north–south highway that passes through Mykolaiv is H (or M)-14.

The main East-West Highway that passes through Mykolaiv is E-58 M-14 (West and then South to Odesa), and South East to Kherson, a major port on the Dneper River, just before it flows into the Black Sea. The E-58 M-14 then continues East to the major industrial city and port in South Eastern Ukraine, Mariupol'.

The main highways to and from Mykolaiv are from Kherson, Odesa, Uman, Chişinău (Kishniev), Moldova, the Crimean Peninsula (Kyiv (Kharkiv (Lviv ( (Western Ukraine). Ukraine's roads, including those leading from Mykolaiv, tend to be poorly maintained and can be very dangerous.

Roads through Mykolaiv include:

the east–west Euro-Asian transport corridor: Odesa–Mykolaiv–Kherson–Dzhankoy–Kerch.
the corridor Organization of the Black Sea Economic Cooperation: Reni–Izmail–Odesa–Mykolaiv–Kherson–Melitopol–Berdyansk–Mariupol–Novoazovsk.
the road M14 (Odesa–Novoazovsk), having an exit to the main highway M18 (Yalta–Simferopol–Kharkiv).

Roads to/from Mykolaiv include:

R-06 (Ulianovka–Mykolaiv) with the highway M05 (Odesa–Kyiv), which, in turn, is linked with the highway M12 in the city district of Uman, having an exit on the route Lublin–Warsaw–Gdańsk (Poland).
N11 (Dnipro–Kryvyi Rih–Mykolaiv)
N14 (Аleksandrovka–Kropyvnytskyi–Mykolaiv)

Bridges 
Mykolaiv, being located at the confluence of two major rivers, has two main bridges.

The Varvarivskyi Bridge over Southern Bug is a swing bridge with Europe's largest span (134 m). It is also the southernmost bridge over the Southern Bug. The bridge connects the North coast of Mykolaiv to its Tsentralnyi Raion, located on the West Bank of the river. The Odeske Highway crosses the bridge and then continues south-west to Odesa.

Another major bridge is the Inhul Bridge crossing the Inhul River. The bridge leads from the north coast of Mykolaiv, and goes north-northeast to the peninsula on the north side of the Inhul, just north of Mykolaiv. On the north Side of the Inhul River, the Heroyiv Stalingrada Highway crosses the bridge, streaming into Pushkinska Street on the other side.

Rail 
Overnight train travel in sleeper-berth passenger trains is a very common way to travel long distances in Ukraine, cheaper, more comfortable and faster than buses – and more environment-friendly, for that matter. There are nightly trains from Kyiv's main passenger train station to Mykolaiv.

In addition to Kyiv, trains from Mykolaiv regularly run to the two closest major cities to Mykolaiv: Odesa (south west of Mykolaiv); and Kherson (south of Mykolaiv). Direct trains to Moscow (26 hours), Kyiv (8-10), Lviv (18), Odesa (5), the Crimea (8 hours) depart every day. Train departures timetable. All trains have coach cars.

Mykolaiv's passenger train station is called Mykolaiv – Passenger. It at the intersection of Myru Avenue and Novozavodska Street 5 (in Ukraine street address numbers are placed after the street name). From the city square outside the railway station, buses depart to all other parts of Mykolaiv.

Mykolaiv's freight train station is called Mykolaiv-Gruzovoi (Freight). It is located at Pryvokzalna ploshcha (Square).

Water-borne travel 

Though a major Ukrainian commercial sea port, Mykolaiv has no regular passenger water-borne service. Water transport is offered by three sea ports and one river port, and also by several terminals. The port is linked with the sea by Dnieper-Bug Estuary canal. The canal begins at the island Berezan and extends  until it reaches the port of Mykolaiv. The canal consistes of 13 tracks, six of which reach Dnieper Estuary, and the rest along the river Southern Bug.

Large ocean-going ships can reach Mykolaiv year round, via the Southern Bug River. Mykolaiv's passenger river port is at Varvarovskii Spusk (Descent) 5.

The ports are:
Mykolaiv Commercial Sea Port
Specialized Seaport Olivia
Dnieper-Bug Sea Commercial Port
Mykolaiv River Port
Sea Specialized Port Nika-Tera

Local transportation 

The main forms of city transport are fixed-route marshrutkas, buses, trolley buses, and trams.

Streetcars (trams) 

From 1897 until 1925 Mykolaiv's streetcars were pulled by horses. Streetcars began to be powered by electricity in 1915, and this has continued through the present. At their inception, the tracks were 1000 millimeters (3'), but during the period from 1952 to 1972 they were switched to standard gauge.

Тrolley Buses 

Mykolaiv's trolley buses have operated since 29 October 1967.

Education 

There are several universities in Mykolaiv. The main universities are: Admiral Makarov National University of Shipbuilding (leading shipbuilding university in Ukraine), Petro Mohyla Black Sea State University, Sukhomlinsky National University of Mykolaiv and Mykolaiv State Agrarian University.

Sukhomlinsky National University of Mykolaiv is the oldest university in Mykolaiv. The idea of the university foundation arose in the 1860s, but it was realized only on July 18, 1913, when the Mykolaiv Teacher's Institute was founded. Nowadays there are 7,000 students studying at the university, 300 teachers working at 36 departments. Annually, the university graduates 1,000 specialists and 60-70 undergraduates.

There are 10 higher education institutions in Mykolaiv of level III or IV accreditation. 65 general education schools, lycees, gymnasium schools, 3 evening schools, and 12 private learning institutions are in the city.

In a survey in June–July 2017, adult respondents reported the following educational levels:
5% primary or incomplete secondary education.
26% general secondary education.
31% vocational secondary education.
38% university education (including incomplete university education).

Religion 

 
Mykolaiv is the headquarters of the Mykolaiv Episcopate of the Ukrainian Orthodox Church of the Moscow Patriarchate, which has 18 churches (temples) in the city.

Mykolaiv is also the headquarters of the Mykolaiv Episcopate of the Orthodox Church of Ukraine, which has succeeded the Kyiv Patriarchate.

A survey in June–July 2017 reported the following results for Mykolaiv:
19% Ukrainian Orthodox Church of the Kyivan Patriarchate.
16% Ukrainian Orthodox Church of the Moscow Patriarchate.
16% atheist.
4% belong to other religions.
44% believe in God, but do not belong to any religion.
2% found it difficult to answer.

Culture 

There are three performing arts theaters in Mykolaiv: the Academic Ukrainian Theater of Drama and Musical Comedy, the Mykolaiv State Puppet Theater, and the Mykolaiv Academic Art Russian Drama Theater. In addition, the Mykolaiv Oblast Philharmonic performs in the city.

Mykolaiv has the following museums: Mykolayiv Regional Museum of Local History, The Museum of Shipbuilding and Fleet, the Museum of the World War II Partisan Movement, the V. V. Vereshchagin Art Museum.

Three movie theaters operate in Mykolaiv: Rodina (Motherland), Pioneer, Multiplex. Movies shown include the latest Hollywood films dubbed into Ukrainian and modern Russian films.

Media 

Popular publications include "Vecherniy Nikolayev" (Evening Mykolaiv), "Nikolaevsckie Novosti" (Mykolaiv News), and "Yuzhnaya Pravda" (Southern Truth). Many publications have an Internet version, but exist in an independent Internet publication.

Television programs that are broadcast in Mykolaiv include movies, news, dramas (some of which originated in other countries, such as Mexico and the US, and are dubbed), cartoons, and professional sporting events such as Ukrainian football (soccer). Mykolaiv has the following TV channels:
1+1; 2+2; 5 Kanal; ICTV; Inter; Real Estate TV; Tonis: K1: Kanal Ukraina; Kultura (Ukraina); CTB; TV: TET; and TRK.

Sports 

Mykolaiv is represented within Ukrainian Bandy and Rink-bandy Federation.

MFC Mykolaiv (Municipal Football Club "Mykolaiv", Ukrainian: Муніципальний футбольний клуб "Миколаїв") is a Ukrainian football club. The club has been relegated three times from the Ukrainian Premier League. MFС Mykolaiv's best achievement in the Ukrainian Premier League was 13th place (in 1994–1995). MFC Mykolaiv reached first place in Druha Liha group A in 2010–11 season and was promoted to Persha Liha. Mykolaiv's main football stadium is at the west end of Tsentralnyi Prospekt, near the west end of the peninsula that Mykolaiv is on. 

Mykolaiv's professional basketball team is MBC Mykolaiv. The team has won or finished second or third in several international tournaments since 1988, and won the Ukrainian Championship in 1992. MBC Mykolaiv is part of the Ukrainian Basketball SuperLeague, which is the top professional basketball league in Ukraine. 

The Nikolaev students won two gold and bronze medals of the Cup of Ukraine on academic rowing.

International relations
Mykolaiv is part of the International Black Sea Club and The World Council of Environmental Initiatives, since ICLEI).

Mykolaiv is twinned with:

 Dezhou, China, since 2009
 Galați, Romania, since 2003
 Kutaisi, Georgia, since 2012
 Nilüfer, Turkey, since 2001
 Tianjin, China, since 2001
 Tinos, Greece, since 2012
 Trieste, Italy, since 1996
 Weihai, China, since 2019
 Zhoushan, China, since 2016

Notable people

Taisia Afonina (1913-1994), Soviet, Russian painter and watercolorist
David Aizman (1869–1922), Russian-Jewish novelist and playwright
Mykola Arkas (1853–1909), Ukrainian composer and historian
Isaak Babel (1894–1940), journalist and writer, spent part of his childhood in Mykolaiv
Paul A. Baran (1909–1964), American Marxist economist
Sy Bartlett (1900–1978), Ukrainian American author and screenwriter/producer of Hollywood films
Yurii Biriukov (born 1974), Ukrainian businessman, politician and founder of Phoenix Wings
Georgy Brusilov (1884–1914?), Arctic explorer
Art Hodes (1904–1993), jazz pianist born in Mykolaiv, emigrated to Chicago as a child
Svetlana Ischenko (born 1969), poet, stage actress, teacher and artist
Boris Kamensky (1870–1949), an Imperial Russian violinist
Vitaliy Kim (born 1981), businessman and politician, the Governor of Mykolaiv Oblast since 2020
Vsevolod Kniaziev (born 1979), Ukrainian judge and lawyer
Stepan Makarov (1849–1904), commander of the Imperial Russian Navy, oceanographer, and author
Max Maltzman (1899–1971), American architect noted during the Art Deco era
Larisa Matveyeva (born 1969), poet, novelist, playwright and translator
Yuri Nosenko (1927–2008), KGB defector, born in Mykolaiv
Maria Orska (1893–1930), actress of the German theater and cinema in the 1920s
Galina Petrova (1920–1943), a medic and Chief Petty Officer in the Black Sea Fleet during WWII
Pinkhus Rovner (1875–1919), Jewish Ukrainian Bolshevik revolutionary
Serhiy Ryzhkov (1958–2017), Ukrainian constructor, ecologist and academic professor
Chana Schneerson (1880–1964), mother of the seventh Chabad-Lubavitch Rebbe, Rabbi Menachem Mendel Schneerson
Rabbi Menachem Mendel Schneerson (1902–1994), the Chabad-Lubavitch Rebbe, born in Mykolaiv and lived there until 1909
Aleksandra Sokolovskaya (1872–1938), Russian Marxist revolutionary and Leon Trotsky's first wife
African Spir (1837–1890), philosopher, studied in Mykolaiv
Iryna Sysoyenko (born 1982), Ukrainian politician and lawyer
Leon Trotsky (1879–1940), revolutionary, studied in Mykolaiv
Konstantin Umansky (1902–1945), Soviet diplomat, editor, journalist and artist
Vladimir Vasilyev (born 1967), Russian science fiction writer and musician
Pyotr Veinberg (1831–1908), Russian poet, translator, journalist and literary historian
Oleg Voloshyn (born 1981), Russian-Ukrainian journalist, political pundit, and former government official
Sergei Zakharov (1950–2019), Russian singer with a rare lyrical baritone
Larisa Matveyeva (born 1969), writer and translator

Sport 

Valeriy Dymo (born 1985) – Ukrainian swimmer who competed in the 2004, 2008 and the 2012 Summer Olympics
Olha Kharlan (born 1990) – fencer; European, world, and Olympic champion in sabre
Olena Khomrova (born 1987) – Ukrainian fencer, team gold medallist in sabre at the 2008 Summer Olympics.
Oleksiy Sereda (born 2005) – Ukrainian diver. At age 13, he was the 2019 European champion in the 10 metre platform event, the youngest ever to win this gold medal; lives in Mykolaiv.
Oxana Tsyhuleva (born 1973) – Ukrainian trampolinist, silver medallist at the 2000 Summer Olympics

See also 
Black Sea Shipyard
Mykolayiv Shipyard
Okean Shipyard

References

Explanatory notes

External links 

Official portal of The Mykolaiv City Council —Note that the Ukrainian language version has more working features than the English and Russian language versions.
Nikolaev Travel Guide for English speaking visitors

 
1789 establishments in the Russian Empire
Cities in Mykolaiv Oblast
Cities of regional significance in Ukraine
Holocaust locations in Ukraine
Khersonsky Uyezd
Oblast centers in Ukraine
Populated places established in 1789
Populated places established in the Russian Empire
Populated places on the Southern Bug
Port cities and towns in Ukraine
Port cities of the Black Sea